Istok is a rural locality (a village) in Cherdynsky District, Perm Krai, Russia. The population was 13 as of 2010. There are 2 streets.

Geography 
Istok is located 116 km southwest of Cherdyn (the district's administrative centre) by road. Koepty is the nearest rural locality.

References 

Rural localities in Cherdynsky District